A major winter and ice storm had widespread impacts across the United States, Northern Mexico, and parts of Canada from February 13 to 17, 2021.  The storm, unofficially referred to as Winter Storm Uri by the Weather Channel, started out in the Pacific Northwest and quickly moved into the Southern United States, before moving on to the Midwestern and Northeastern United States a couple of days later.

The storm resulted in the National Weather Service issuing various winter weather alerts impacting over 170 million Americans. Over 9.9 million people in the U.S. and Mexico experienced blackouts, many due to a major power crisis in Texas, which became the largest in the U.S. since the Northeast blackout of 2003. The storm contributed to a severe cold wave that affected most of North America. The storm also brought severe destructive weather to Southeastern United States, including several tornadoes. On February 16, there were at least 20 direct fatalities and 13 indirect fatalities attributed to the storm; by January 2, 2022, the death toll had risen to at least 290, including 276 people in the United States and 14 people in Mexico. 

The National Oceanic and Atmospheric Administration officially documented $25.6 billion in damage in the United States from the winter storm. Aon PLC, a finance company, estimated the system is estimated to have cost over $196.5 billion (2021 USD) in damages, including at least $195 billion in the United States and over $1.5 billion in Mexico. This would make it the costliest winter storm on record, as well as the costliest natural disaster recorded in the United States. It is also the deadliest winter storm in North America since the 1993 Storm of the Century, which killed 318 people.

Meteorological history 
On February 13, a frontal storm developed off the coast of the Pacific Northwest and moved ashore, before moving southeastward, with the storm becoming disorganized in the process. On the same day, The Weather Channel gave the storm the unofficial name Winter Storm Uri, due to the expected impacts from the storm; the Federal Communications Commission later adopted the name in their reports after February 17. From February 12 to 13, a trough dipped southward from Northern California into northern Mexico, which channeled moisture from Texas towards the storm, as the system moved southeastward. Over the next couple of days, the storm began to develop as it entered the Southern United States and moved into Texas. From February 13 to 14, a second, much larger trough developed over Central United States, aided by a southward shift from the polar vortex, while the winter storm moved into Texas. The trough became fully developed by February 15, channeling significant amounts of moisture into the winter storm and also contributing to a historic cold wave that affected most of the Central and Eastern United States. Winds in the jet stream reached 170 mph (275 km/h) around the trough. On February 15, the system developed a new surface low off the coast of the Florida Panhandle, as the storm turned northeastward and expanded in size.

On February 16, the storm developed another low-pressure center to the north as the system grew more organized, while moving towards the northeast. Later that day, the storm broke in half, with the newer storm moving northward into Quebec, while the original system moved off the East Coast of the U.S. By the time the winter storm exited the U.S. late on February 16, the combined snowfall from the multiple winter storms within the past month had left nearly 75% of the contiguous United States covered by snow, which was the largest amount of snow cover seen in the United States since early 2003. On February 17, the storm's secondary low dissipated as the system approached landfall on Newfoundland, intensifying in the process. At 12:00 UTC that day, the storm's central pressure reached , as the center of the storm moved over Newfoundland. On the same day, the storm was given the name Belrem by the Free University of Berlin. On February 20, the storm developed a second-low pressure area and gradually began to weaken, as it moved northwestward towards Iceland. Afterward, the storm turned westward and moved across southern Greenland on February 22, weakening even further as it did so. The storm then stalled south of Greenland, while continuing to weaken, before dissipating on February 24.

Preparations and impact

United States 
On February 14, the expected impacts from the storm resulted in over 170 million Americans being placed under various winter weather alerts across the United States, which saw the largest portion of the country covered by winter weather alerts in 15 years. Over 120 million of those people were placed under winter storm warnings or ice storm warnings by the National Weather Service. The winter storm caused power grids to fail across the U.S., causing blackouts for over 5.2 million homes and businesses, the vast majority of which were in the state of Texas, which became one of the largest blackout events in modern U.S. history, the largest one since the Northeast blackout of 2003. The storm left at least 276 people dead across the United States, with 246 of them in Texas. The initial death toll had been estimated at 70 before it was later revised upward, after more information was collected. A BuzzFeed study in May 2021 estimated that the winter storm may have killed a total of 702 people in Texas, which would add hundreds of deaths to the official death toll if verified. The system was estimated by NOAA to have cost $21 billion in damage in the United States, making it the costliest winter storm in U.S. history. Austin County and Travis County officials estimated that the winter storm caused at least $195 billion in damage in Texas, making the winter storm the single-costliest natural disaster in the history of Texas and the United States as a whole. Some insurance firms had estimated a damage total as high as $195–295 billion.

Northwest 

The winter storm was the second of the two snowstorms that swept through the region within a one-week period.  of snow in Seattle, Washington, compounded the previous storm. This was the largest two-day snowfall recorded in Seattle since 1972.

The Portland metro area was hit very hard by the storm, which brought a mix of snow and ice to the region.  of snow fell at Portland International Airport on February 12–13, the most snow to fall over this city in a two-day period since 1968. Over 270,000 people were left without power in the region. Governor Kate Brown declared a state of emergency. Four people were killed in Oregon, due to Carbon monoxide poisoning.

 of snow also fell in Boise, Idaho, during this same time period, making this the largest recorded two-day snowfall event for that city since 1996. In Salt Lake City, the  made this their snowiest February day on record.

Southwest 
The storm brought heavy snow and bitterly cold temperatures to Colorado and New Mexico. In New Mexico, the storm system brought a combination of heavy snow, strong winds, and bitterly cold temperatures. On February 14, a Blizzard Warning was issued for the Albuquerque metro area due to strong winds exceeding , cold temperatures, and blowing snow. Meanwhile, Winter Storm Warnings were issued for much of the rest of New Mexico. Up to two feet of snow fell in the mountains of northern and central New Mexico. Interstate 40 through the Albuquerque metro area was closed for several hours due to numerous motor vehicle crashes caused by the icy conditions. Southern New Mexico received up to two inches of snow accumulation, with locally higher amounts in the mountains.

Central and Southern Plains 

With the threat of icing, the Texas Department of Transportation (TxDOT) pre-treated roadways, using a brine-salt mix, across six Southeast Texas counties. For the first time on record, the National Weather Service (through its 13 regional offices serving Texas and adjoining portions of Oklahoma, New Mexico, Arkansas and Louisiana) issued Winter Storm Warnings for all 254 counties in the state. Wind chills predicted to be at or below  promoted the first ever wind chill warning for Dallas as well.

On February 14–15, the storm dropped prolific amounts of snow across Texas and Oklahoma. As a result of the winter storm and a concurrent cold wave, power grids—unable to sustain the higher-than-normal energy and heating demand from residential and business customers—failed across the Texas Interconnection; at the peak of the outages, at least 4.5 million Texas residents were left without electricity. Two of the electricity reliability commissions servicing the Southern U.S., the Southwest Power Pool (SPP) and the Electric Reliability Council of Texas (ERCOT), ordered rolling blackouts for 14 states amid the frigid temperatures, in an attempt to manage the strain on the power grid and prevent widespread, long-duration blackouts. The controlled outages were initiated after the Southwest Power Pool declared Level 3 Emergency Energy Alerts on both February 15 and 16; the SPP and ERCOT faced criticism by government officials and residents in the region for the limited advanced notice of the outages, and for not outlining the specific areas serviced by SPP partner utilities that would be affected.

At one point during the rolling outages, over 4.2 million people across the south-central states were left without power, with over 3.5 million of them in Texas alone. The rolling blackouts led to calls by Governor Greg Abbott for the Texas Legislature to conduct investigations into preparations and decisions undertaken by ERCOT in advance of the storm. Some of the blackouts were initiated as several cities throughout the Central and Southern Plains experienced record overnight low temperatures: on February 16 alone, daily record lows were broken in Oklahoma City (the city's coldest temperature since 1899 and its second-coldest on record), Dallas (the city's coldest temperature since 1930 and its second-coldest on record), Houston (the city's coldest temperature since 1989), San Antonio (the city's coldest temperature since 1989) and Little Rock (the city's coldest temperature since 1989), with all-time low temperatures being set in Fayetteville, Arkansas and Hastings, Nebraska.

Rolling blackouts, longer-duration power outages and ice accretion caused by the precipitation and unusually cold temperatures (for the region's climate) caused widespread disruptions to water distribution systems across the Southern Plains. Water line breaks occurred in many areas, and power disruptions impacted water treatment plants in parts of the region that forced several cities—including Houston, San Antonio, Fort Worth, Abilene, Austin, Killeen and Arlington, Texas; and Shreveport, Louisiana—to enact residential boil-water orders (i.e., to boil drinking water for one minute in order kill bacteria and other pathogens); By February 18, more than 13 million people in Texas lived in areas covered by boil-water advisories. In cases where residents had no energy sources to heat water, purchasing bottled water was advised; in Houston, this led to shortages of bottled water in grocery stores. In addition, pipe bursts caused significant damage to numerous residences in the Dallas area and other areas of North Texas.

After consulting Dallas Mayor Eric Johnson, two NHL games between the Nashville Predators and the Dallas Stars that were scheduled for the evenings of February 15 and 16 at American Airlines Center were postponed. In contrast, the Oklahoma City Thunder opted to hold their February 16 home game against the Portland Trail Blazers as scheduled, even as most other buildings in Downtown Oklahoma City decided to turn off lighting and electrical equipment overnight to reduce strain on the city's power grid; the NBA team stated that Chesapeake Energy Arena would take steps to conserve power while the game was being played, including turning off concourse lighting, video panels, exterior signage and most outdoor lighting.

Due to the deregulated electricity market and the spike in demand, since February 10, wholesale electricity prices have gone up in some places by 10,000 percent. As a result, some Texans are receiving exceptionally expensive electric bills as high as $450 for one day of use. On February 17, U.S. Senator Ted Cruz (R-TX) stirred controversy when he was filmed boarding an airplane to Cancún, Mexico with his family. He returned to Houston the following day, and admitted he had scheduled the vacation to avoid freezing conditions inside their home.

In Oklahoma, winter storm warnings were issued for all 77 counties in the state ahead of the storm by National Weather Service offices in Norman, Tulsa, Amarillo and Shreveport. Governor Kevin Stitt also issued a statewide winter weather State of Emergency on February 12, as the state was already dealing with effects from minor winter weather events and prolonged sub-freezing temperatures from the days prior. Roosevelt saw  of snow, the highest total measured in the state during the event.

The heavy, blowing snow caused massive travel issues across the state on February 14. By 5:20 p.m. CST that day, the Oklahoma Highway Patrol had responded to 56 non-injury collisions, 24 injury collisions, and 116 motorist assists. A fiery crash involving multiple vehicles, including two semi-trucks, shut down the Turner Turnpike near Hiwassee Road in northeastern Oklahoma County, with westbound traffic being diverted to the Kickapoo Turnpike and eastbound traffic being diverted to I-35. Another vehicle collision on I-35 near Braman caused one fatality. The record cold temperatures during the event also caused a dam at Lake Overholser to completely freeze over.

By February 16, the storm had killed at least 17 people across the South. By February 18, the death toll rose to at least 47. At least 10 people in Texas died in weather-related incidents since February 14, including a mother and a child due to carbon monoxide poisoning. By January 2, 2022, the Texas State Government revised the official death toll in Texas to 246. Nine other people in the South, outside of Texas, have died as a result of the system or through indirect storm-related incidents. According to a BuzzFeed study in May 2021, based on the excess mortalities in Texas in February 2021, the actual death toll of the winter storm may range from 426 to 978 in Texas, with a mean estimate of 702, which would add hundreds of deaths to the official death toll, if verified. The official death toll was modified in December 2021 with the Texas Department of State Health Services announcing a death toll of 246.

The storm was also partially responsible for a nationwide chicken shortage, due to the freezing temperatures, widespread power and water outages that lasted days.

Great Lakes 

Indianapolis, Indiana, received about 7 inches of snow as well as Detroit, Michigan, also had 7 inches of snow. Toledo, Ohio, received  of snow, the third-highest two-day snowfall record, and the highest since 1912.

Tornado outbreak 

A severe weather outbreak struck the Southeastern United States on February 15, with large hail, damaging winds, and six tornadoes affecting five states. An EF2 tornado destroyed two homes and damaged trees near Damascus, Georgia, injuring five people. A more destructive high-end EF3 tornado struck the Ocean Ridge Plantation neighborhood near Sunset Beach, North Carolina, causing major damage to many homes, some of which were leveled or swept away, before moving into rural areas and damaging or snapping hundreds of trees. This tornado killed three and injured 10.

Confirmed tornadoes

Sunset Beach–Delco, North Carolina

The tornado touched down at the north edge of Sunset Beach, just north of the border with South Carolina, damaging numerous pine trees and limbs at EF0 intensity as it crossed NC 179, before rapidly intensifying to EF2 strength as it neared NC 904. The storm was not tornado-warned immediately and a warning wasn't issued until after the tornado touched down and began causing damage. As the tornado crossed the road, a large metal building was destroyed and a number of RVs were overturned. Still rapidly strengthening, the tornado entered Grissettown and struck the Ocean Ridge Plantation subdivision at its peak intensity of high-end EF3. A community garden center and two homes were leveled at this location, one of which was swept completely away. This home was well-constructed, but built on a block foundation, and vehicles parked at the site were moved only short distances. Dozens of other nearby homes were damaged, some of which sustained loss of roofs and exterior walls. Many large trees were snapped and denuded in the subdivision, and a car was overturned. All three fatalities occurred in the Ocean Ridge Plantation subdivision. The tornado then abruptly weakened, but reached its maximum width as it crossed U.S. 17 between Grissettown and Cool Run as it exited Ocean Ridge Plantation at EF1 strength, rolling a double-wide mobile home on the north side of the highway. As the tornado continued northeast, it reintensifed to EF2 strength, causing major damage to several homes and snapping hundreds of trees. It then inflicted a continuous path of tree damage through forest and swamp land, crossing NC 130 and NC 211. The tornado finally lifted east of NC 211. It was the deadliest single tornado in Southeastern North Carolina since an F3 touched down on November 16, 2006, and the first deadly tornado in Brunswick County. With this tornado causing 3 deaths, this became the 6th year in a row to see a tornadic fatality in February.

Mexico 

The winter storm strained the power grids in northern Mexico, leading to cascading blackouts for 4.7 million homes and businesses in Mexico. At least 14 people died in Ciudad Juárez, Chihuahua; Río Bravo and Matamoros, Tamaulipas; and Monterrey, Nuevo León; due to the winter storm. President Andrés Manuel López Obrador (AMLO) said on February 17 that Mexico would increase the use of oil and coal to produce electricity, as well as purchase three shiploads of natural gas to deal with power shortages. He also warned that periodic local outages would continue through February 21. Local authorities mentioned that no hospitals had been left without electricity at any time. The storm was estimated to have caused over $1.5 billion (2021 USD) in damages in Mexico.

Canada 
In Ontario, snowfall warnings were issued in advance of the winter storm. School bus service was cancelled across the Greater Toronto Area, and schools were completely closed in Halton and Durham.  of snow fell in Windsor,  at Toronto Pearson International Airport and  fell in Ottawa.

Aftermath
The storm was shortly followed by another major winter storm a few days later, which caused at least an additional 29 fatalities and $2 billion (2021 USD) in damage, worsening the 2021 Texas power crisis and hampering recovery efforts in the state.

See also 

 2011 Groundhog Day blizzard
 December 2014 North American storm complex
 February 2021 North American ice storm
 February 15–20, 2021 North American winter storm
 February 2022 North American winter storm
 List of major power outages

Notes

References

External links 

 Archive of Storm Summaries from the Weather Prediction Center
 Event Review from the Weather Prediction Center

2020–21 North American winter
2021 natural disasters in the United States
2021 cold waves
Articles containing video clips
Natural disasters in Texas
Blizzards in the United States
Ice storms
Ice storms in the United States
February 2021 events in North America
February 2021 events in the United States
Extratropical cyclones
Tornadoes of 2021
Tornadoes in Florida
Tornadoes in Georgia (U.S. state)
Tornadoes in North Carolina
F3 tornadoes
Cold waves in the United States
Blizzards